Lady Catharine Long (née Walpole; 1797 – 30 August 1867) was an English novelist and religious writer of the 19th century.

Biography
Catherine Long was the youngest daughter of Horatio Walpole, 2nd Earl of Orford, and his wife Sophia Churchill. She married Henry-Lawes Long of Hampton Lodge, Surrey, 22 July 1822. She died suddenly - according to the Dictionary of National Biography - "from alarm in a thunderstorm" on 30 August 1867, leaving seven daughters (one of whom, Charlotte Caroline Georgina Long, married Henry Howard) and a son. She engaged in much literary work, chiefly in the way of religious fiction, and published some pieces of sacred music.

Literary analysis
Long's first work, Sir Roland Ashton, a Tale of the Times,  was a religious novel directed against the tractarian movement. Stevens notes that Long reflected on contemporary concerns about the morality and aesthetics of the use of the novel form for religious subject-matter in her preface to the book, but notes that "Long's notion of novel writing being 'in God's hands' with the author as a kind of amanuensis, was one that was becoming increasingly familiar as the century wore on".

Works
Her works are: 
 Sir Roland Ashton, a Tale of the Times, London 1844, 8vo
 Midsummer Souvenir, Thoughts Original and Selected, 1846, 32mo. 
 An Agnus Dei for four or five voices, 1848. 
 Christmas Souvenir, 1848, 32mo. 
 Heavenly Thoughts for Morning Hours, 1851, 18mo. 
 Heavenly Thoughts for Evening Hours, Lond. 1856, 18mo. 
 The Story of a Drop of Water, Lond. 1856. 
 First Lieutenant's Story, Lond. 1856, 12mo. 
 The Story of a Specific Prayer, Lond. 1863. 
 Herein is Joy, selections from Morning and Evening Thoughts. 
 He is not Dead, he cannot Die, in memory of Prince Albert, words and music. 
 For Wounds like these, Christ is the only Cure, set to music.

References

Works cited

External links
Full texts from the Internet Archive:
Sir Roland Ashton
The First Lieutenant's Story

Attribution

1797 births
1867 deaths
19th-century English novelists
English women novelists
19th-century English women writers
19th-century British writers